Shawn Loiseau (born October 10, 1989) is an American football linebacker for the Massachusetts Pirates of the National Arena League (NAL). He is one of the most decorated student-athletes in Merrimack College history, and became the first Merrimack Warrior ever to sign an NFL deal.

Early years
A native of Shrewsbury, Massachusetts, Loiseau attended Shrewsbury High School, where he set team record with 136 tackles as a senior in 2007. He was named Massachusetts Defensive Player of the Year and helped his team to a state championship, but was ignored by Division I schools because of an assault and battery conviction in his junior year after he beat a kid into a vegetable with a pipe.

He played college football at Merrimack College. Loiseau finished his career with 382 tackles, including 377 in his final three seasons, ranking him first all-time in school history. He broke the school record for tackles in a season with 133 in 2010 and was named 2nd team All-American. Loiseau was twice named Northeast-10 Conference Defensive Player of the Year, marking the first time a Merrimack player earned that award on two occasions.

Professional career

2012 NFL Draft
Projected as a seventh-round selection, Loiseau was listed as the No. 9 inside linebacker available in the 2012 NFL Draft. Sports Illustrated described him as a "tough-run defending linebacker who is best in the box", who, however, "struggles at playing football."

Houston Texans
Loiseau was signed by the Houston Texans on May 14, 2012, after going undrafted in the 2012 NFL Draft. The Texans released Loiseau on September 1, 2012.

Indianapolis Colts
On January 7, 2013, the Indianapolis Colts signed Loiseau to a Reserve/Future contract. On April 30, 2013, he was waived by the Colts. On August 8, 2013, he was re-signed by the Colts. He was released again on September 6, 2013.

Los Angeles KISS
On June 24, 2014, Loiseau was assigned to the Los Angeles KISS of the Arena Football League (AFL).

Sioux Falls Storm
On September 1, 2016, Loiseau signed with the Sioux Falls Storm of the Indoor Football League (IFL). On December 13, 2016, Loiseau was released by the Storm.

Nebraska Danger
On January 3, 2017, Loiseau signed with the Nebraska Danger. He was released on February 9, 2017. On May 23, 2017, Loiseau was re-signed by the Danger.

References

External links

Indianapolis Colts bio
Merrimack Warriors bio

1989 births
Living people
People from Shrewsbury, Massachusetts
Sportspeople from Worcester County, Massachusetts
Players of American football from Massachusetts
American football linebackers
Merrimack Warriors football players
Indianapolis Colts players
Los Angeles Kiss players
Hudson Valley Fort players
Sioux Falls Storm players
Nebraska Danger players
Massachusetts Pirates players